Umzimkhulu is a town in Harry Gwala District Municipality in the KwaZulu-Natal province of South Africa.

The town lies 243 km north-east of Mthatha, 18 km south-west of Ixopo, and 108 km south south-west of Pietermaritzburg, the provincial capital. It developed from a trading-post and was laid out in 1884. Takes its name from the Mzimkulu River on which it is situated; Zulu and Xhosa for 'big place', 'large home' of the waters.

Until 1 March 2006, the town was part of an exclave of the Eastern Cape, before being transferred to KwaZulu-Natal as part of the Twelfth Amendment of the Constitution of South Africa.

During the KwaZulu-Natal riots of July, 2021, more than 50 people died in a furniture store in the town that was set alight while looters were robbing it.

References

Populated places in the Umzimkhulu Local Municipality
Populated places established in 1884
1884 establishments in the British Empire